The Bentonville West Central Avenue Historic District is a residential historic district west of the center of Bentonville, Arkansas.  Located along West Central Avenue between A and G Streets stand forty houses, most of which were built between 1885 and 1935.  They represent a concentration of the finest residential architecture of the period in the city.  The houses are stylistically diverse, including two Italianate houses and six Craftsman houses.  Notable among the former is the Craig-Bryan House, a brick structure that also has Gothic vergeboard decoration.

The district was listed on the National Register of Historic Places in 1992.

See also
National Register of Historic Places listings in Benton County, Arkansas

References

Italianate architecture in Arkansas
Historic districts in Benton County, Arkansas
Historic districts on the National Register of Historic Places in Arkansas
National Register of Historic Places in Bentonville, Arkansas
Victorian architecture in Arkansas
Bungalow architecture in Arkansas
American Craftsman architecture in Arkansas